Lachesilla nubilis is a species of fateful barklouse in the family Lachesillidae. It is found in Central America, North America, and Oceania.

References

Lachesillidae
Articles created by Qbugbot
Insects described in 1886